Bouqras is a large, oval shaped, prehistoric, Neolithic Tell, about  in size, located around  from Deir ez-Zor in Syria.

Excavation
The tell was discovered in 1960 by Dutch geomorphologist, Willem van Liere. It was excavated between 1960 and 1965 by Henri de Contenson and van Liere and later between 1976 and 1978 by Peter Akkermans, Maurits van Loon, J. J. Roodenberg and H. T. Waterbolk.

Construction
The earliest levels, 11 to 8, showed early Neolithic aceramic occupation developing on to stages with pottery in levels 7 to 1, from which over 7000 sherds were recovered. Material from later levels was visible on the surface when first discovered. The layout and arrangement of houses seems to have been well ordered with similar arrangements of rooms, entrances, hearths and other features. Houses were made of mud bricks and generally rectangular with three or four rooms.

Culture
Bouqras seems to have developed in comparative isolation with few other settlements near the area. Interiors of the buildings featured white plastered walls with occasional use of red ochre for decoration with some images of birds. By later stages of the settlement, it was likely inhabited by as many as 700 to 1000 villagers. Large quantities of obsidian was found suggesting links with Anatolia. A distinctive group of limestone, alabaster and gypsum vessels was also found made from local materials. Rounded or cylindrical beads were also found made of bone, shell, greenstones, carnelian and dentalium. An alabaster bracelet fragment and pendant were recovered as forms of personal decoration. Several stone stamp seals including one of alabaster and one of jadeite were found with incised rectilinear patterns along with a few clay figurines. Pottery started to be found from the third level of habitation including a white plaster vessel. Other materials were varied with coarse and fine sherds made with mixed straw and sand. Some sherds were burnished or painted red, one with a triangle on it. Arrowheads recovered included Byblos points and two types of Amuq points along with two other distinctive designs. Flints were usually of a fine dark grey or brown type found locally.

Agriculture and animal domestication
Paleobotanical studies were carried out by Willem van Zeist on carbonized plant remains recovered via water flotation. This has shown rain fed agriculture was practiced at Bouqras including cultivation of Emmer, Einkorn and free-threshing wheat, naked and hulled barley, peas and lentils. Sickle blades, querns and pounders appear in the early stages at Bouqras, but not in later stages. White Ware was found suggested to have been used as basket covering to make them impermeable.

Sheep and goat comprised approximately 80% of the 5800 identifiable fragments of animal remains found. Other fauna included pigs and cattle, the domestication of which is uncertain. Deer, gazelle and onager were also hunted.

References

Further reading 
 de Contenson, H., van Liere, W.J., A Note on Five Early Neolithic Sites in Inland Syria 13, 175–209, 1963.
 de Contenson, Henri, & van Liere, Willem, Premier sondage à Bouqras en 1965. Rapport préliminaire, Annales Archéologiques Arabes Syriennes XVI 2, 1966, p. 181-192.
 de Contenson, H., Découvertes récentes dans la domaine du Néolithique en Syrie, L'Anthropologie, 70, 388–391, 1966.
 Vogel, J.C., Waterbolk, H.T., Groningen Radiocarbon Dates VII, Radiocarbon, 9, 107–155, 1967.
 Clason, A.T., The Animal Remains from Tell Es Sinn Compared with those from Bouqras, Anatolica, 7, 35–53, 1980.
 Akkermans, P.A., Fokkens, H., Waterbolk, H.T., Stratigraphy, architecture and layout of Bouqras in Cauvin, J. and Sanlaville (eds.) 1981, Préhistore du Levant: Chronologie et organisation de l´éspace depuis les origines jusqu´au VIe millenaire, Colloque International du CNRS, Lyon 1980, Paris, 485–502, 1981.
 Akkermans, P.A., Boerma, J.A.K., Clason, A.T., Hill, S.G., Lohof, E., Meiklejohn, C., Le Mière, M., Molgat, G.M.F., Roodenberg, J., Waterbolk-van Rooijen, W., van Zeist, W., Bouqras Revisited: Preliminary Report on a Project in Eastern Syria. Proceedings of the Prehistoric Society, 49, 335–372, 1983.
 de Contenson, Henri,	La campagne de 1965 à Bouqras, Cahiers de l'Euphrate, 4, 335–371, 1985.
 Roodenberg, J., Le mobilier en pierre de Bouqras. Utilisation de la pierre dans un site néolithique sur le Mayen Euphrate (Syrie)	Leiden/Istanbul: Nederlands Historisch-Archaeologisch Instituut, 1986.
 Lohof, E., A lesser known figurine from the near eastern Neolithic, Haex et al. (eds.) 1989 in To the Euphrates and Beyond: Archaeological Studies in Honour of Maurits N. van Loon, Balkema, Rotterdam, 65–74, 1989.
 Clason, A.T., The Bouqras Bird Frieze, Anatolica, 16, 209–213, 1990.
 Boerma, J.A.K., Palaeo Environment and Palaeo Land-Evaluation Based on Actual Environment Conditions of Tell Bouqras, East Syria, Anatolica, 16, 215–249, 1990.
 Bernbeck, R., Die Auflösung der häuslichen Produktionsweise, Berliner Beiträge zum Vorderen Orient 14 (Ph.D. dissertation Berlin, Freie Univ. 1991), Berlin, 1994.

External links 

 Archaeological finds (photos)
 University of Colgne Radio-carbon context database entry for Bouqras
 A Feminine Aragonite Statuette from Northern Syria (Tell Bouqras?)

Neolithic settlements
Neolithic sites in Syria
Archaeological sites in Deir ez-Zor Governorate
1960 archaeological discoveries